The Tideway is a part of the River Thames in England which is subject to tides. This stretch of water is downstream from Teddington Lock. The Tideway comprises the upper Thames Estuary including the Pool of London.

Tidal activity
Depending on the time of year, the river tide rises and falls twice a day by up to 7 m (24 ft). Because the tide goes against the outflow of fresh water from the Thames Basin, it takes longer to subside (6–9 hours) than it does to flow in (4–5 hours).

London Bridge is used as the basis for published tide tables giving the times of high tide. High tide reaches Putney about 30 minutes later.

Low-lying banks of London are naturally vulnerable to flooding by storm surges. The threat has increased due to a slow but continuous rise in high water level, caused by the extremely slow 'tilting' of Britain (up in the north and down in the south) due to post-glacial rebound and the gradual rise in sea levels due to climate change. The city and state have erected defensive barriers, including the Thames Barrier, which was constructed across the Thames at Woolwich to deal with this threat.

Responsibilities

The Tideway, often referred to as the Port of London, is managed by the Port of London Authority (PLA). The upstream limit of this authority is marked by an obelisk just short of Teddington Lock and to seaward by the London Stone at Yantlet Creek. The PLA is responsible for one lock on the Thames: Richmond Lock.

Within Greater London, the Tideway is secured by the Metropolitan Police Marine Policing Unit. 
East of Crayford Ness, Essex Police and Kent Police assume responsibility in their respective jurisdictions. 21st-century criminal investigations have included the Roberto Calvi and Torso in the Thames cases. 

London Fire Brigade maintains a fire boat on the river in central London.

As a result of the Marchioness disaster in 1989, when 51 people died, the Government asked the Maritime and Coastguard Agency, the Port of London Authority, and the Royal National Lifeboat Institution (RNLI) to work together to set up a dedicated Search and Rescue service for the tidal River Thames. Since 2002, four lifeboat stations have been established on the Thames, at: Teddington, Chiswick, Tower Pier, and Gravesend.

Navigation

The River is navigable to large ocean-going ships as far as the Pool of London at London Bridge. The Port of London is the United Kingdom's second largest port by tonnage. Today, little commercial traffic passes above the Thames Barrier. Central London is visited occasionally by cruise ships or warships, which moor alongside HMS Belfast, and a few smaller aggregate or refuse vessels, operating from wharves in the west of London. Most trade is handled by the Port of Tilbury, roll-on/roll-off ferry terminals at Dagenham and Dartford, and petroleum products handling facilities at Purfleet, Coryton and Canvey Island.

The tidal river is used for leisure navigation. In London sections there are many sightseeing tours in tourist boats past riverside attractions such as the Houses of Parliament and the Tower of London, as well as regular riverboat services provided by London River Services. This section is not suitable for sporting activity because of the strong stream through the bridges.

Rowing has a significant presence upstream of Putney Bridge, while sailing takes place in the same area and also along the coasts of the Estuary. The annual Great River Race for traditional rowed craft takes place over the stretch from Greenwich to Ham. Thames meander challenges along the length of the Thames from Lechlade often pass through the London sections and finish well downstream, for example at Gravesend Pier.

The Grand Union Canal joins the river at Brentford, with a branch – the Regent's Canal – joining at Limehouse Basin. The other part of the canal network still connecting on the Tideway is the River Lea Navigation via Bow Lock.

Environment
 Narrow low-lying belts beside the tidal section of the Thames regularly flood at spring tides, supporting brackish plants. One such example is at Chiswick Lane South, where the river, as pictured, overflows this road a few times per year. (Picture taken in 2006).

Although water quality has improved over the last 40 years and efforts to clean up the Tideway have led to the reintroduction of marine life and birds, the environment of the Tideway is still poor. Heavier rainfall in London causes overflows from pipes on the river banks from the standard type of sewer in the capital, the combined sewer. These CSOs can cause the deaths of marine life and health hazards for river users.

The Thames Tideway Scheme, under construction, aims to divert most of the overflow from sewers into a tunnel under the river.

Thames Estuary

The Thames Estuary is bordered by the coast and the low-lying lands upstream between the mouth of the River Stour on the Essex/Suffolk border and The Swale in north Kent. It is now usually designated the Greater Thames Estuary and is one of the largest inlets on the coast of Great Britain. The water can rise by 4 metres moving at a speed of 8 miles per hour.

The estuary extends into London near Tower Bridge, and can be divided into the Outer Estuary up to the Swale at the west end of the Isle of Sheppey, and the Inner Estuary, designated the Thames Gateway above this point. The shore of the Outer Estuary consists of saltmarshes and mudflats, but there are man-made embankments along much of the route. Behind these, the land is cultivated or used for grazing. Parts of the Outer Estuary are on a major shipping route.

Thames Gateway

Its boundary was drawn to capture the riverside strip that formerly hosted many land extensive industries, serving London and the South East. The decline of these industries has left a legacy of large scale dereliction and contaminated land, but an opportunity for major redevelopment. The area includes the London Docklands, Millennium Dome, London Riverside and Thames Barrier.

Major crossings
Dartford Crossing including two Dartford Tunnels (1963 and 1980) and the cable-stayed Queen Elizabeth II Bridge (1991)
Blackwall Tunnels (Alexander Binnie, 1897; second bore 1967)
Jubilee line and Docklands Light Railway tunnels
Greenwich foot tunnel (Alexander Binnie, 1902)
Rotherhithe Tunnel (Maurice Fitzmaurice, 1908)

Tributaries
Pitsea Creek, Mar Dyke and River Ingrebourne
River Rom (lower reaches known as the Beam) and River Dart
River Roding (tidal reach known as 'Barking Creek')
River Lea or Lee (tidal reach known as 'Bow Creek')
Ravensbourne (tidal reach known as 'Deptford Creek')

Islands and peninsulas
Isle of Grain— actually a peninsula
Two Tree Island
Canvey Island
Lower Horse Island
Frog Island, Rainham
Isle of Dogs — actually a peninsula

Pool of London

The Pool of London is divided into two parts, the Lower Pool and Upper Pool. The Lower Pool traditionally runs from the Cherry Garden Pier in Rotherhithe to Tower Bridge. The Upper Pool consists of the section between Tower Bridge and London Bridge. In the 18th and 19th centuries the river was lined with nearly continuous walls of wharves running for miles along both banks, and hundreds of ships moored in the river or alongside the quays. The lack of capacity in the Pool of London prompted landowners to build London's Docklands with enclosed docks with better security and facilities. The abrupt collapse of commercial traffic in the Thames due to the introduction of shipping containers and coastal deep-water ports in the 1960s emptied the Pool and led to all of the wharves being closed down. The Lower Pool area was extensively redeveloped in the 1980s and 1990s to create new residential and commercial neighbourhoods, often using converted warehouses. In the Upper Pool this provided scope for office development in the City of London and Southwark.

Major crossings
Rotherhithe Tunnel (Maurice Fitzmaurice, 1908)
Thames Tunnel (Wapping to Rotherhithe Tunnel) (Marc Brunel, 1843; the world's first underwater tunnel, now part of the East London Line)
Tower Bridge (1894)

Inner London

Between London Bridge and Putney Bridge, the river passes through Central London and some of the most famous landmarks.

River boats carry tourists up down and across the river, and also provide a regular commuter service.

Major crossings
Northern line, Waterloo & City line, Bakerloo line, Jubilee line, Victoria line, tunnels
London Bridge (1973)
Cannon Street Railway Bridge (1982)
Southwark Bridge (1921)
Millennium Bridge (2002)
Blackfriars Railway Bridge (1886)
Blackfriars Bridge (1869)
Waterloo Bridge (1945) (the "women's bridge")
Hungerford Footbridges (Golden Jubilee Bridges) (2002)
Charing Cross (Hungerford) Bridge (1864)
Westminster Bridge (1862)
Lambeth Bridge (1932)
Vauxhall Bridge (1906)
Grosvenor Bridge (Victoria Railway Bridge) (1859)
Chelsea Bridge (1937)
Albert Bridge (1873)
Battersea Bridge (Sir Joseph Bazalgette, 1890) (Henry Holland, 1771)
Battersea Railway Bridge (1863)
Wandsworth Bridge (1938)
Fulham Railway Bridge (1889)

Tributaries
(culverted tributaries largely converted to sewers are marked ‡)
Walbrook‡
River Fleet‡
Neckinger‡ (save for mouth)
Tyburn‡
Westbourne‡
Counter's Creek (also known as 'Chelsea Creek')‡ (save for mouth)
Effra‡
Wandle

Outer London

From Putney Bridge to Teddington Lock, the river passes through inner and outer suburbs such as Hammersmith, Chiswick, Barnes, Richmond on Thames and Ham. This part of the Tideway is home to most of London's rowing clubs, and is the venue for training and racing throughout the year. The Championship Course over which The Boat Race and many other events are run, stretches from Putney to Mortlake.

Major crossings
Putney Bridge (Sir Joseph Bazalgette, 1886) (Phillips & Ackworth, 1729)
Hammersmith Bridge (Sir Joseph Bazalgette, 1887)
Barnes Railway Bridge (1849)
Chiswick Bridge (1933)
Kew Railway Bridge (1869)
Kew Bridge (John Wolfe-Barry, 1903)
Richmond Lock and Footbridge (1894)
Twickenham Bridge (1933)
Richmond Railway Bridge (1848)
Richmond Bridge (1777)

Tributaries
Beverley Brook
Stamford Brook‡
Brent
Duke of Northumberland's River (manmade)
Crane
Sudbrook

Islands
Chiswick Eyot, Chiswick
Oliver's Island, Strand-on-the-Green
Brentford Ait, Brentford
Lot's Ait, Brentford
Isleworth Ait, Isleworth
Corporation Island, Richmond
Glover's Island, Twickenham
Eel Pie Island, Twickenham
Swan Island, Twickenham

See also
Geography of London
Islands in the River Thames
List of crossings of the River Thames
List of locations in the Port of London
Locks and weirs on the River Thames
Rowing on the River Thames
Subterranean rivers of London

References

External links
 The Thames Estuary Partnership
 The Port of London Authority
 The Mirror of the Sea, Joseph Conrad at Wikiquote. From the estuary to the Port of London by boat in 1906, when the port was the commercial heart of the British Empire.
 London's River – An intriguing journey down the Thames in rare archive film.
 River Thames Boat Blog – A blog with articles dedicated to helping people get the most from boating on the Tidal River Thames in London.
 London Bridges – A view of London Bridges over the River Thames
 Fantasy flight along the Thames in a high-speed pod from the London Eye!
 Thames Discovery Programme community archaeology project

Rivers of London
Rivers of Kent
Coastal environment of Essex
Geography of the River Thames
Thames Estuary